The Ogden Community School District, or Ogden Community Schools, is a public school district headquartered in Ogden, Iowa.

The district is completely within in Boone County. The district serves Ogden, Beaver, Berkley, and the surrounding rural areas.

Dr. Pam Dodge has served as superintendent since 2018, after serving as a principal in the Ankeny Community School District for six years.

Beginning in 2020, the district entered an agreement with United Community School District to share a superintendent.  Dr. Dodge is serving as superintendent for both districts.

Schools
The district has three schools on a single campus in Ogden.
Ogden Elementary School
Ogden Middle School
Ogden Senior High School

Ogden High School

Athletics
The Bulldogs compete in the West Central Activities Conference in the following sports:
Cross Country
Volleyball
Football
Basketball
Wrestling
Track and Field
Golf 
Baseball
Softball

Students from Ogden can also participate in the following sports as part of the teams from Boone:
Soccer

See also
List of school districts in Iowa
List of high schools in Iowa

References

External links
 Ogden Community School District

School districts in Iowa
Education in Madison County, Iowa
Education in Dallas County, Iowa